Dixeia charina, the African small white, is a butterfly in the family Pieridae and is native to southeastern Africa.

The wingspan is 34–40 mm in males and 36–42 mm in females. Its flight period is year-round.

Larvae feed on Capparis citrifolia and Capparis sepiaria.

Subspecies
Listed alphabetically:
D. c. charina (southern Mozambique, South Africa, Eswatini)
D. c. dagera (Suffert, 1904) (Tanzania)
D. c. liliana (Grose-Smith, 1889) (eastern and coastal Kenya, northern Tanzania)
D. c. narena (Grose-Smith, 1898) (Madagascar)
D. c. pulverulenta (Dixey, 1929) (Kenya)
D. c. septentrionalis Bernardi, 1958 (eastern and northern Ethiopia)
D. c. simana Hopffer, 1855 (northern Mozambique)

References

Seitz, A. Die Gross-Schmetterlinge der Erde 13: Die Afrikanischen Tagfalter. Plate XIII 14

Butterflies described in 1836
Pierini
Butterflies of Africa
Taxa named by Jean Baptiste Boisduval